Elior Seiderer is an Israeli football who plays for Hapoel Ra'anana as a forward.

Career
He started his career at the Hapoel Acre youth system, He scored 54 goals at 3 seasons at the youth system. On May 11, 2009 he made his debut at the senior team against Hapoel Bnei Lod.

In summer 2011 he on loaned to Sektzia Ma'alot-Tarshiha, and at summer 2012 on loaned to Hapoel Afula.

In summer 2013 he return to Acre, On October 19, 2013 he scored his debut goal at Acre at the win 3–1 against Hapoel Ra'anana.

External links
 

1991 births
Living people
Israeli Jews
Israeli footballers
Hapoel Acre F.C. players
Maccabi Sektzia Ma'alot Tarshiha F.C. players
Hapoel Afula F.C. players
Hapoel Umm al-Fahm F.C. players
Hapoel Kfar Shalem F.C. players
Shimshon Kafr Qasim F.C. players
Hapoel Ra'anana A.F.C. players
Liga Leumit players
Israeli Premier League players
Footballers from Nahariya
Association football forwards